"Chinese Democracy" is a song by the American rock band Guns N' Roses, and the title track from their sixth studio album. It was released as a radio single on October 22, 2008 and was released on the iTunes Store on November 9, 2008. It was primarily written by Axl Rose and Josh Freese. It was the band's first single of original material since "Estranged" was released in 1994 as the final single off the 1991 album Use Your Illusion II.

Commercially, "Chinese Democracy" charted well in most territories. It was particularly successful in Scandinavian countries, topping the Norwegian Singles Chart and reaching number three in Sweden and Finland. The song reached the top 20 in Italy, the Netherlands, Poland and Switzerland, as well as number 27 on the UK Singles Chart and in Flemish Belgium and New Zealand. In North America, the song reached number 10 in Canada and number 34 in the United States. The song reached number five on the US Mainstream Rock chart.

Origins
Prior to the song being released as a single, "Chinese Democracy" had been played live by Guns N' Roses on their Chinese Democracy Tour in 2001, 2002, 2006 and 2007.

The final line of the song was originally "like if your ass were your head, you can tell", but was ultimately changed to "when their arms reach out for your help".

Axl Rose introduced the band's first live performance of the song in Las Vegas, Nevada on January 1, 2001 with the following:

Reception
The song has received a mostly positive reception from critics. It was played over 4 million times on Myspace in one day. Spin Magazine noted that with "a thick, muscular four-chord riff and that Axl banshee wail, only the most stubbornly jaded will manage to suppress the goosebump reflex", but criticized it for being "hook-free".

The Los Angeles Times, on the other hand, described Axl as "the most ambitious hard rocker of the late 20th century" and though also noting that "the chorus is just an extension of the verses" and that the song therefore "doesn't behave the way radio-friendly singles usually do", still stated that "the refrain sticks after several listens". Ultimately, the Los Angeles Times concluded that the song "brings back a passionate weirdness that the hard rock airwaves have lacked", also comparing it to David Bowie's "I'm Afraid of Americans", noting that "Both songs have a suffocated quality, as if their makers are pushing through smoke to express these thoughts. It's the sound of florid, romantic rockers aiming for something cold and modern".

Popwatch noted that not "even the greatest GNR song ever conceived could possibly be worth so sustained a buildup" and echoed the sentiment that the chorus of the song "feels like the buildup to a great refrain, but turns out to really be the refrain", while MenStyle.com suggested that, judging amongst the leaked songs, "Chinese Democracy" was a curious choice for lead single, suggesting that "Madagascar" or "There Was a Time" would have been superior.

A review on the site Zimbio argued that "no matter how I wanted to hate this song, I can't", describing the tune as "better than some songs on Use Your Illusion I and Use Your Illusion II" and declared that "if you can put your bias aside, you will find this song isn't bad" and that "it does make me excited to hear the rest of the album".

The then former Guns N' Roses guitarist Slash reacted positively to the song upon release, saying "That sounds cool. It's good to hear [Axl Rose's] voice again, y'know".

The song was the official theme of WWE's Armageddon 2008 pay-per-view.

Live performances
"Chinese Democracy" has been played live at most Guns N' Roses shows since the first Chinese Democracy Tour in 2001. With each tour, the performances drastically changed, gaining more background structure and guitar parts, along with a second solo akin to the album version. From 2009 to 2014, the song was used exclusively as the show opener.  The song continues to be played even after the pre-Chinese Democracy members, Slash and Duff McKagan, have rejoined.

Personnel
Credits are adapted from the album's liner notes.

Guns N' Roses
 Axl Rose – lead vocals, keyboards
 Paul Tobias, Ron "Bumblefoot" Thal and Richard Fortus – rhythm guitar
 Robin Finck and Buckethead – lead guitar, rhythm guitar
 Tommy Stinson – bass, backing vocals
 Frank Ferrer – drums
 Dizzy Reed – keyboards, backing vocals
 Chris Pitman – sub bass, keyboards, backing vocals

Additional credits
 Guitar solos – Robin Finck, Buckethead
 Intro – Eric Caudieux, Caram Costanzo
 Arrangement – Axl Rose, Paul Tobias, Sean Beavan
 Digital editing – Eric Caudieux, Caram Costanzo, Axl Rose, Sean Beavan
 Additional guitar processing – Chris Pitman

Charts

References

Guns N' Roses songs
2008 singles
Number-one singles in Norway
Songs about China
Songs written by Axl Rose
Songs written by Josh Freese
Protest songs
Songs written by Robin Finck
Songs written by Dizzy Reed
Songs written by Paul Tobias
2008 songs
Songs written by Tommy Stinson
Industrial rock songs
Geffen Records singles